Roger Arendse (born 5 August 1993) is a South African cricketer. He made his first-class debut for Northerns in the 2012–13 CSA Provincial Three-Day Competition on 8 November 2012. He made his Twenty20 debut for Northerns in the 2017 Africa T20 Cup on 2 September 2017.

References

External links
 

1993 births
Living people
South African cricketers
Northerns cricketers